The Thayer family is an American Boston Brahmin family. They are descended from early settlers and brothers Thomas Thayer (1596–1665) and Richard Thayer (1601–1664).

Notable members

 Atherton Thayer (1766-1798), Sheriff
 Ebenezer Thayer (1746-1809), Sheriff 
 Thomas Thayer (1596–1665), Pilgrim.
 Richard Thayer (1601–1664), Pilgrim.
 Simeon Thayer (1737–1800), American Revolutionary War officer 
 Sylvanus Thayer (1785–1872), United States Army general, Father of West Point
 Nathaniel Thayer, Jr. (1808–1883), financier, philanthropist, and one of the most generous citizens of Boston
 Nathaniel Thayer, III (1851–1911), capitalist and pioneer railroad promoter
Bayard Thayer (1862–1916), millionaire sportsman, horticulturist
John Eliot Thayer (April 3, 1862 – July 29, 1933) ornithologist
 Eugene Van Rensselaer Thayer (1855–1907), financier and capitalist
 Eugene Van Rensselaer Thayer, Jr. (1881–1937), banker and businessman
 Adin Thayer (1816–1890), New York politician
Alexander Wheelock Thayer (1817–1897), American librarian, journalist, and biographer 
 Andrew J. Thayer (1818–1873), United States Representative from Oregon 
William Wallace Thayer (1827–1899), Governor of Oregon and brother of Andrew J. Thayer
James Bradley Thayer (1831–1902), American legal writer and educationist
Amos Madden Thayer (1841–1905), United States federal judge
Francis S. Thayer (1822–1880), New York politician
William Roscoe Thayer (1859–1923), American historian 
 Harry Irving Thayer (1869–1926), United States Representative from Massachusetts

 Ernest Thayer (1863–1940), American poet, author of "Casey at the Bat", and uncle of Scofield Thayer
 Scofield Thayer (1889–1982), American poet and publisher
 Eli Thayer (1819–1899), United States Representative from Massachusetts
John A. Thayer (1857–1917), United States Representative from Massachusetts
 John Milton Thayer (1820–1906), Governor of Nebraska, Governor of Wyoming, United States Senator, and Civil War general
Samuel R. Thayer (1837–1909), United States Ambassador to the Netherlands 
 John R. Thayer (1845–1916), United States Representative from Massachusetts
 Abbott Handerson Thayer (1849–1921), American painter, amateur naturalist, and teacher 
 Webster Thayer (1857–1933), the judge at the trial of Sacco and Vanzetti
 William Greenough Thayer (1863–1934), American educator
Sigourney Thayer (1896–1944), poet, theatrical producer, and aviator
Robert H. Thayer (1901–1984), American lawyer, naval officer, and diplomat
 Edwin Pope Thayer (1864–1943), Secretary of the United States Senate from 1925–1933
 Martin Russell Thayer (1819–1906), United States Representative, great uncle of John Borland Thayer
 John Borland Thayer (1862–1912), American businessman who died on the RMS Titanic
 Jack Thayer (1894–1945), his son, survivor of the Titanic sinking
James B. Thayer (1922-2018), United States Brigadier General
Tommy Thayer (born 1960), lead guitarist for the rock band Kiss
Tom Thayer (born 1961), retired American football player for the Chicago Bears and Miami Dolphins

References

 
Political families of the United States